Portabad (also Romanized as Portābād; also known as Portok, Pūrtā, and Pūrtow) is a village in Birk Rural District, in the Central District of Mehrestan County, Sistan and Baluchestan Province, Iran. At the 2006 census, its population was 218, in 48 families.

References 

Populated places in Mehrestan County